This is a list of palaces and mansions in Bács-Kiskun County in Hungary.

List of palaces and mansions in Bács-Kiskun County

See also
 List of palaces and mansions in Hungary
 List of castles in Hungary

Literature
 Zsolt Virág : Magyar Kastélylexikon - Bács-Kiskun megye kastélyai, 2006

References

Bács-Kiskun County
Houses in Hungary